Up in Rags/With Our Wallets Full is a collection of early recordings by the American indie rock band Cold War Kids. After a surge of internet buzz and a heavy touring schedule in 2006, Cold War Kids packaged their previous two six-song EPs together as a full-length LP. The album consists of the same recordings on Up in Rags and With Our Wallets Full. The album was released on Monarchy Music as a promotional compilation LP of their very rare first two EPs (which were limited to 500 copies each).

Track listing

A-side
 "Hang Me Up to Dry" - 3:38
 "Robbers" - 3:31
 "We Used to Vacation" - 4:14
 "Saint John" - 3:48
 "Hospital Beds" - 4:46
 "Pregnant" - 4:24

B-side
 "Hair Down" - 3:41
 "Red Wine, Success!" - 2:39
 "Tell Me In The Morning" - 3:38
 "Expensive Tastes" - 5:02
 "Rubidoux" - 4:14
 "Sermons vs The Gospel (demo)" - 3:41

Credits
Bass - Matt Maust
Drums, Percussion - Matthew Aveiro
Guitar, Piano, Vocals - Jonathan Bo Russell
Vocals [Lead], Guitar, Piano - Nathan Willett
Producer - Matt Wignall (Hang Me Up To Dry) and Jason Martin of Starflyer 59 fame (With Our Wallets Full)

References

2006 compilation albums
Cold War Kids compilation albums